Leone Buyse (born 1947) is the Joseph and Ida K. Mullen Professor of Flute and Chair of Woodwinds at Rice University's Shepherd School of Music. Prior to a full-time career teaching, Buyse spent over 22 years as an orchestral flutist, including a decade from 1983-1993 as Principal Flute of the Boston Symphony Orchestra and Boston Pops Orchestra. Other orchestral positions include Rochester Philharmonic as solo piccolo and second flute, and assistant principal of San Francisco Symphony. In addition to the Shepherd School, she has held faculty positions at the New England Conservatory, Boston University, University of Michigan, as visiting professor at the Eastman School of Music and numerous summer festivals including the Tanglewood Institute. Her primary teachers include Marcel Moyse, Jean-Pierre Rampal, Michel Debost and Joseph Mariano.

Biography 
Leone Karena Buyse was born in 1947 into a musical family and grew up in Ithaca, New York. Her mother received two degrees from the Eastman School of Music, which Buyse later attended. Ithaca is home to Cornell University, where she along with her family often attended concerts and heard many of the important musicians of the time, including flutists Julius Baker and Albert Tipton, and composer Nadia Boulanger. This musical upbringing and exposure to world class musicians from an early age contributed greatly to her musical development. Buyse first began playing the violin and piano, then switched to the flute at age nine. When she was 12, she began studying with David Berman of Ithaca College before attending the Eastman School of Music to study with Joseph Mariano in 1965. In 1968 during her time at Eastman, she received a Fulbright Scholarship to study in France with Jean-Pierre Rampal, Marcel Moyse and Michel Debost, three internationally distinguished flutists and pedagogues. Buyse graduated with Distinction and a Performer's Certificate from Eastman in 1968. In 1969, she was selected as the only American finalist in that year's Geneva International Flute Competition.

Subsequently, she received a Master of Music Degree in Flute Performance from Emporia State University (then Kansas State Teacher's College), while teaching undergraduate flute students and studying flute repertoire with the woodwind faculty. Her Master's Thesis titled "The French Rococo Style Exemplified in Selected Chamber Works of Joseph Bodin Boismortier (1689-1755)", was published in The Emporia State Research Studies in 1979. Her first professional orchestral position was with the Rochester Philharmonic as solo piccolo and second flute. She credits this position as giving her confidence to grow as an orchestral player and preparing her for positions in the San Francisco Symphony and later, the Boston Symphony. Buyse was invited by Seiji Ozawa to join the Boston Symphony as assistant principal of the Symphony and principal of the Boston Pops in 1983.

During her career as a part of the Boston Symphony, she appeared as a soloist numerous times with the orchestra and with the Boston Symphony Chamber Players. She also appeared with the l'Orchestre de la Suisse Romande, San Francisco Symphony, Utah Symphony and the New Hampshire Music Festival, where she acted as principal flute for over a decade. During her time in Boston, she collaborated and recorded with many artists, including her colleague and Eastman classmate Fenwick Smith. She has appeared in recital with international soloists Jessye Norman and cellist Yo-Yo Ma, in addition to chamber ensembles from the Juilliard School of Music  and Muir String Quartets, the Boston Musica Viva, and Da Camera of Houston. In 1992, she received the Distinguished Alumna Award from Emporia State University.

In 1993, she decided to pursue a more active career as a teacher. Since that time, she has held faculty positions at the New England Conservatory, Boston University, University of Michigan, and numerous summer festivals including the Tanglewood Institute. She was awarded the National Flute Association's Lifetime Achievement Award for significant and outstanding contributions to the global flute community in 2010. Buyse is recognized as one of the foremost flute pedagogues in America, and the international community. Her students hold positions in major US and North American orchestras, as well as teaching positions at universities such as the University of Texas at Austin, University of Colorado at Boulder, and St. Olaf College, in addition to many others. Buyse is also an accomplished pianist and served as Rampal's collaborative pianist for two of his famous summer schools in Nice, France.

She currently holds positions at Rice's Shepherd School of Music and the Youth Orchestra of the Americas. She travels throughout the US and internationally for recitals and masterclasses, including Mexico, Brazil, Panama, Chile, Italy, France, The Netherlands, Canada, Japan, Australia, and New Zealand.

Personal life 
Buyse married clarinetist and conductor Michael Webster in 1988. He holds the position of Professor of Music at the Shepherd School of Music at Rice University and Artistic Director of the Houston Youth Philharmonic Orchestra. Buyse, Webster and pianist Robert Moeling form the Webster Trio, an internationally recognized chamber ensemble. The duo aims to increase the repertoire which exists for this instrumentation of flute, clarinet and piano.

Discography 
Music of Richard Toensing; Leone Buyse, flute, National Symphony of Ukraine, Theodore Kuchar, Anthology of Recorded Music, Inc. (2001)

Hindemith: Sonatas for Woodwind Instruments and Piano; Anton Nel, Fred Ormand, Leone Buyse & Sigland Bruhn, Equilibrium (1998)

Released on Crystal Records
 CD317: The Sky's the Limit: A Celebration of 20th Century American Music for Flute; Leone Buyse, flute, Fenwick Smith, flute and alto flute, Martin Amlin, piano (1993)
 CD319: Rivier Revisited: Chamber Music for Flute featuring flutist Leone Buyse with Chamber Ensembles (2002) 
 CD715: Dedicated to Barrère; Leone Buyse, Flute, Martin Amlin, Piano (2006)
 CD716: Dedicated To Barrère, Vol. 2; Leone Buyse, Flute; Martin Amlin, piano, Paula Page, harp (2007)
 Webster Trio
 CD356: Tour de France, Webster Trio (with Katherine Collier, Piano)
 CD357: World Wide Webster 
 CD717: American Webster
Released on Albany Records
 Martin Amlin: Music for Flute, Clarinet & Piano (2015) 
 American Vistas; Mimmi Fulmer, soprano, Leone Buyse, flute and alto flute (2009)

References

External links 
 Leone Buyse, Shepherd School of Music, Rice University

American classical flautists
Women flautists
Living people
Eastman School of Music alumni
Emporia State University alumni
1947 births